Grande Fratello 6 was the sixth season of the Italian version of the realisty show franchise Big Brother. The show was produced by Endemol and it was aired from 19 January 2006 to 27 April 2006.

Alessia Marcuzzi as the main host of the show for the first time.

Housemates

Nominations table

 Housemate is on the Poor team or Team 1
 Housemate is on the Rich team or Team 2

TV Ratings

References

2006 Italian television seasons
06